Sharland is an English surname. Notable people with the surname include:
 Alfred Sharland (1890-1944), English cricketer.
 Elizabeth Sharland, actress
 Michael Sharland, Australian journalist
 Wallace Sutherland "Jumbo" Sharland (1902-1967), Australian rules football player, journalist and commentator

English-language surnames